Stroncone is a town in Umbria, Italy. Stroncone may also refer to:

Santa Lucia Stroncone Astronomical Observatory, an observatory in Stroncone
5609 Stroncone (1993 FU), a main-belt asteroid discovered from the observatory